Blind Woman's Curse is a 1970 Japanese film directed by Teruo Ishii.

Plot 
Akemi (Kaji) is a dragon tattooed leader of the Tachibana yakuza clan. In a duel with a rival gang, Akemi slashes the eyes of an opponent and a black cat appears to lap the blood from the gushing wound. The cat and the victim of the slashing go on to seek revenge on Akemi's gang, leaving a trail of dead yakuza girls with their dragon tattoos skinned from their bodies.

Cast 
 Meiko Kaji - Akemi Tachibana
 Hoki Tokuda - Aiko Goda 
 Makoto Satō - Tani
 Hideo Sunazuka - Kantaro
 Shirō Otsuji - Senba-tatsu
 Ryōhei Uchida as Aozora
 Toru Abe - Dobashi
 Tatsumi Hijikata - Ushimatsu, Hunchback dancer

Release
Blind Woman's Curse was released in Japan on 20 June 1970. It was distributed theatrically in the United States by Toho International 6 August 1971.

References

Sources

External links 

1970 action films
1970 films
Discotek Media
Japanese action films
1970s Japanese films